John's of Bleecker Street, simply known as John's Pizzeria, is a historic pizzeria on Bleecker Street in the Greenwich Village neighborhood of Manhattan in New York City. Founded in 1929, the pizzeria serves coal fired brick oven pizza prepared in the style of a tomato pie. In 2015, it was ranked the 10th best pizzeria in the United States by TripAdvisor.

John's is known for its graffiti-carved wooden booths where any patron can carve their name. The pizzeria does not serve slices, only whole pies cooked in an 850° F oven, along with calzones, and accepted cash only until May 2016, when it began accepting credit cards.

History
John's was founded in 1929 by John Sasso, originally located on Sullivan Street in Greenwich Village. After losing his lease in 1934, he moved the pizzeria to Bleecker Street. The restaurant was later purchased by the Vesce brothers in 1954. 

In the 1960s, Augustine (Chubby) Vesce  purchased John's Pizzeria from his brother Joe. He and his wife Rose became the owners of John's until 1980-81. Augustine suffered from health issues and offered 40% of the restaurant's shares to current manager at the time, Pete Castellotti Sr, if he continued to manage the business, allowing Augustine to retire. A year or two later, Castellotti opened up John's on 64th St, moved to Florida and opened John's of New York in Port Charlotte, letting his two children Pete Castellotti Jr. and Lisa Free run John's of Bleecker Street together with his longtime co-worker Robert "Bob" Vittoria.

Castellotti's ex-wife Madeline left her job as a personnel director of Cadwalader, Wickersham & Taft, a Manhattan law firm, to open a John's Pizzeria in the eighties on the Upper West Side. She opened John's Pizzeria on Times Square in 1994. In 1993, Bob Vittoria became the majority partner of John's Pizzeria on Bleecker. He is a nephew of the Vesce family.

Documents show the pizzeria actually opened in 1915 by Filippo Milone.  John Sasso was related by marriage took over in 1925.

Ratings
John's has been highly rated throughout its operation. Adam Kuban of Serious Eats considers it an NYC Quintessential pizza for connoisseurs.

See also
 List of Italian restaurants
 List of restaurants in New York City

References

External links

 

1929 establishments in New York City
Greenwich Village
Italian-American culture in New York City
Italian restaurants in New York City
Pizzerias in New York City
Restaurants established in 1929
Restaurants in Manhattan